atm⁵ is an interbank network in Singapore, connecting the ATMs of six of Singapore's eight qualifying full banks, QFB.  , there are 230+ atm⁵ ATMs island-wide. The network was established in April 2005.

atm⁵ is also one of the few interbank networks that does not charge its customers for transactions via another member bank's ATM, having removed all interbank transaction charges on April 4, 2006.

While Citibank has many ATMs, only a percentage of them are part of the atm⁵ group. Hence, banks usually recommend customers to make sure that the atm⁵ logo is present on the members' ATM before they carry out their transaction(s).

Members
atm⁵ is the primary network of the following banks listed below:

See also
List of banks in Singapore
ATM usage fees

References

 Atm5 network at Maybank

Banks of Singapore
Interbank networks